Lorenzo Villaseñor (born 17 January 1947) is a Mexican sailor. He competed at the 1968 Summer Olympics and the 1972 Summer Olympics.

References

External links
 

1947 births
Living people
Mexican male sailors (sport)
Olympic sailors of Mexico
Sailors at the 1968 Summer Olympics – Flying Dutchman
Sailors at the 1972 Summer Olympics – Flying Dutchman
Sportspeople from Mexico City